WIXE (1190 AM) is a commercial radio station in Monroe, North Carolina.  It is owned by Monroe Broadcasting and airs a local talk radio format along with classic country music and southern gospel on Sundays.  WIXE uses local disc jockeys during the day and is automated at night, carrying the syndicated John Tesh radio show, "Intelligence for Your Life," playing Classic Country Music with Tesh's dialogue.

By day, WIXE broadcasts at 5,000 watts, using a non-directional antenna.  Because 1190 AM is a clear channel frequency, WIXE greatly reduces power at night to 70 watts to avoid interference.  Programming is also heard on a 180 watt FM translator station, W226CD at 93.1 MHz.

Staff
WIXE Staff

Morgan - President & Owner
Shane Greene - Program Director
Kathie Easton - Sales Manager
Emily Taylor - Office Manager
Emory Altman - Producer/On-Air
Chris Rogers - Producer/On-Air
Alex Helms - Sales/On-Air
Megan Brink - Special Event Director
“Sideline” Mike Whitmire - Football
Hayden McAteer - Football
Orlando Diaz - Saturday On-Air

History

On May 3, 1968, the station first signed on the air.  Originally WIXE was a daytimer, powered at 500 watts by day but required to go off the air at night.  At first, it tried a Top 40 format.

Ray Atkins became co-owner of WIXE in 1971 after Top 40 did not work, switching to country music, the second Charlotte-area station to Top 40 after WSOC-FM. Atkins had previously played country music as a DJ on WMAP in Monroe, As a musician, he played steel guitar with Arthur Smith and Bill Hefner.

In summer 1988, for the first time in its 20 years on the air, WIXE ranked second only to WBT among AM radio stations in the Charlotte market.

On July 10, 2008, a truck accidentally backed into one of the guy wires of the station's nearly-190-foot-tall tower, bringing the tower down and knocking the station off the air. While the AM broadcast signal was off, WIXE continued streaming online.

Monroe Broadcasting owner Archie Morgan and his team began the construction of a new tower for the station. By 11 o'clock that night, the broadcast signal was back on the air thru the use of a horizontal dipole antenna. The plan was for this antenna to be used until the new tower could be built.

As of September 21, 2008, WIXE was back up to full power with the new tower, as well as a new ground system. The station already reached nine counties, and the replacement of the 40-year-old ground system made an improvement in coverage into Mecklenburg and surrounding counties.

References

External links

IXE
Country radio stations in the United States
Radio stations established in 1968